Abrak-e Do (also Romanized as Ābrāk-e Do; also known as Ābrāk) is a village in Howmeh-ye Sharqi Rural District, in the Central District of Izeh County, Khuzestan Province, Iran. At the 2006 census, its population was 225, in 39 families.

References 

Populated places in Izeh County